Jordan Smylie (born 28 February 2000) is an Australian professional footballer who plays as a forward for Blacktown City.

Playing career
In September 2021, Smylie left Central Coast Mariners to join National Premier Leagues NSW side Blacktown City. He made his debut for Blacktown against the Mariners in the 2021 FFA Cup on 13 November 2021.

References

External links

2000 births
Living people
Australian soccer players
Association football forwards
Central Coast Mariners FC players
Blacktown City FC players
National Premier Leagues players
A-League Men players